Achères is the name or part of the name of several communes in France:

 Achères, Cher, in the Cher département
 Achères, Yvelines
 Achères-la-Forêt, in the Seine-et-Marne département